Seek and Destroy is a 1993 Amiga action video game developed by Vision Software and published by Mindscape, and released in 1994 for the Amiga CD32. A different version was also developed for MS-DOS by the same developer and released in 1996 by publisher Safari Software (then a division of Epic MegaGames). The game bears resemblance to Desert Strike: Return to the Gulf.

Reception

The Amiga version of "Seek and Destroy" was well received with positive reviews from Amiga Format, Amiga Power, CU Amiga and The One.

References

External links

DOS games
Amiga games
Amiga 1200 games
Amiga CD32 games
Helicopter video games
Multidirectional shooters
1993 video games
Video games developed in New Zealand
Tank simulation video games
Mindscape games